Amphicallia thelwalli is a moth of the subfamily Arctiinae first described by Herbert Druce in 1882. It is found in south-eastern Africa.

The wingspan is about 70 mm.

Larvae of subspecies tigris have been recorded on Crotalaria species.

Subspecies
Amphicallia thelwalli thelwalli (Malawi)
Amphicallia thelwalli tigris (Butler, 1883) (Kenya, Uganda)
Amphicallia thelwalli zebra (Rogenhofer, 1894) (Tanzania)

References

Moths described in 1882
Arctiinae
Moths of Sub-Saharan Africa
Lepidoptera of Uganda
Lepidoptera of Malawi
Lepidoptera of Tanzania
Lepidoptera of Kenya